The 2005–06 Macedonian First League was the 14th season of the Macedonian First Football League, the highest football league of Macedonia. The first matches of the season were played on 5 August 2005 and the last on 21 May 2006. Rabotnichki defended their championship title, having won their second title in a row.

Promotion and relegation

Participating teams

League table

Results 
Every team will play three times against each other team for a total of 33 matches. The first 22 matchdays will consist of a regular double round-robin schedule. The league standings at this point will then be used to determine the games for the last 11 matchdays.

Matches 1–22

Matches 23–33

Relegation playoff

Top goalscorers

See also
2005–06 Macedonian Football Cup
2005–06 Macedonian Second Football League

External links 
Macedonia - List of final tables (RSSSF)
Football Federation of Macedonia

Macedonia
1
Macedonian First Football League seasons